CognoVision Solutions Inc. was a Toronto-based provider of real-time audience measurement and retail intelligence solutions. The company created Anonymous Video Analytics (AVA)  software that uses small video cameras and real-time Computer vision algorithms to detect faces and people for measuring viewership of Digital signage or estimating traffic flow patterns in a retail store.

On November 15, 2010, it was announced that Intel Corporation, the world's largest semiconductor chip maker, had acquired CognoVision - the acquisition closed in September 2010. Intel Corporation announced August 8, 2011 that Anonymous Video Analytics from Cognovision would be the underlying technology powering their Intel AIM Suite service.

History 
CognoVision was founded in 2006. The company was privately financed and was acquired by Intel Corporation in 2010.

The company was started by Haroon F. Mirza (CEO), Dr. Shahzad Malik (CTO), and Faizal Javer (President & COO). The founders all met while students at Carleton University in Ottawa, Ontario, Canada in 2000. Each founder independently relocated to Toronto - Malik completed his Ph.D. at University of Toronto, Javer was expanding a mattress manufacturing business from Western Canada to Ontario, and Mirza was working at Cadbury Adams.

Privacy 
CognoVision's technology respects privacy by never recording images or video footage, and relying on pattern detection algorithms that only look for general characteristics of a human face rather than features which can uniquely identify an individual. Once the AVA program has determined pixel patterns of a human face, the software categorizes how long the display is viewed, the approximate gender and approximate age of the viewer.

However, the technology is often incorrectly compared to the retina scanners, like those in the film Minority Report, that privacy groups are pushing for legislation to prevent more intrusive biometric recognition technologies from becoming mainstream.

Milestones 
 May 2006 - CognoVision founded
 Apr 2007 - CognoVision ranked as semi-finalist in TiEQuest 2007 Business Venture Competition
 June 2007 - CognoVision ranked 2nd in MaRS Upstart Contest
 Feb 2008 - CognoVision launched its solutions at the Digital Signage Expo 2008
 Oct 2008 - CognoVision-powered nCAP wins Artisan Complete a 2008 DIGI Award for Best Product with Audience Measurement
 Mar 2009 - CognoVision wins rAVe DS 2009 Champ Award: Most innovative DS software product: CognoVision's AIM System
 Nov 2009 - CognoVision wins 2009 DIGI Award for Best New Audience Measurement Package
 Nov 2009 - CognoVision named to the CIX Top 20 Innovative Companies of 2009
 Dec 2009 - Canadian Innovation Exchange names CognoVision as Canada's 2009 Digital Media and Innovation Leader
 Mar 2010 - CognoVision wins rAVe DS 2010 Champ Award: Best DS Software Add-on App
 Apr 2010 - Branham300 names CognoVision to Top 20 ICT Up & Coming Companies
 Sep 2010 - CognoVision acquired by Intel Corporation

References

External links 
Intel Digital Signage homepage

Companies established in 2006
Companies based in Toronto
Audience measurement
Intel acquisitions